The name Hilda has been used for fourteen tropical cyclones worldwide. It was used in the Atlantic before the formal naming system was instituted, but was then retired due to the destruction it caused in 1964. However, it remains in use in the Eastern Pacific, where it was first used in 1979.

Atlantic
Hurricane Hilda (1955)
Hurricane Hilda (1964) – struck Louisiana, caused extensive damage to New Orleans

Eastern Pacific
Tropical Storm Hilda (1979)
Tropical Storm Hilda (1985)
Tropical Storm Hilda (1991)
Tropical Storm Hilda (1997)
Tropical Storm Hilda (2003)
Tropical Storm Hilda (2009)
Hurricane Hilda (2015)
Hurricane Hilda (2021)

Western Pacific
Tropical Storm Hilda (1999) (01W, Auring) – brought heavy rain to Sabah.

Southwest Indian
Cyclone Hilda (1963)

Australian Region
Cyclone Hilda (1990)
Cyclone Hilda (2017)

Atlantic hurricane set index articles
Pacific hurricane set index articles
Pacific typhoon set index articles
South-West Indian Ocean cyclone set index articles
Australian region cyclone set index articles